The Kerguelen Islands ( or ; in French commonly  but officially), also known as the Desolation Islands ( in French), are a group of islands in the sub-Antarctic constituting one of the two exposed parts of the Kerguelen Plateau, a large igneous province mostly submerged in the southern Indian Ocean. The islands, along with Adélie Land, the Crozet Islands, Amsterdam and Saint Paul islands, and France's Scattered Islands in the Indian Ocean, are part of the French Southern and Antarctic Lands and are administered as a separate district.

The climate is harsh and chilly with frequent high winds throughout the year. The surrounding seas are generally rough and they remain ice-free year-round. There are no indigenous inhabitants, but France maintains a permanent presence of 45 to 100 soldiers, scientists, engineers, and researchers. There are no airports on the islands, so all travel to and from the outside world is conducted by ship.

History 
Before being officially catalogued in 1772, the Kerguelen Islands appear as the "Ile de Nachtegal" on Philippe Buache's 1754 map entitled Carte des Terres Australes comprises entre le Tropique du Capricorne et le Pôle Antarctique où se voyent les nouvelles découvertes faites en 1739 au Sud du Cap de Bonne Esperance ('Map of the Southern Lands contained between the Tropic of Capricorn and the Antarctic Pole, where the new discoveries made in 1739 to the south of the Cape of Good Hope may be seen'). It is possible this early name was after Abel Tasman's ship De Zeeuwsche Nachtegaal. On the Buache map, "Ile de Nachtegal" is located at 43°S, 72°E, about 6° north and 2° east of the accepted location of Grande Terre.

The islands were officially discovered by the French navigator Yves-Joseph de Kerguelen-Trémarec on 12 February 1772. The next day, Charles de Boisguehenneuc landed and claimed the island for the French crown. Yves de Kerguelen organised a second expedition in 1773 and arrived at the "baie de l'Oiseau" by December 1773. On 6 January 1774 he commanded his lieutenant, Henri Pascal de Rochegude, to leave a message notifying any passers-by of the two passages and of the French claim to the islands.

Thereafter, a number of expeditions briefly visited the islands, including the third voyage of Captain James Cook in December 1776. Cook verified and confirmed the passage of de Kerguelen by discovering and annotating the message left by the French navigator.

Soon after its discovery, the archipelago was regularly visited by whalers and sealers (mostly British, American, and Norwegian) who hunted the resident populations of whales and seals to the point of near extinction, including fur seals in the 18th century and elephant seals in the 19th century. The sealing era lasted from 1781 to 1922 during which time 284 sealing visits are recorded, nine of which ended when the vessel was wrecked. Modern industrial sealing, associated with whaling stations, occurred intermittently between 1908 and 1956. Since the end of the whaling and sealing era, most of the islands' species have been able to increase their population again. Relics of the sealing period include try pots, hut ruins, graves and inscriptions.

In 1800, the  spent eight months sealing and whaling around the islands. During this time Captain Robert Rhodes, her master, prepared a chart of the islands. That vessel returned to London in April 1801 with 450 tons of sea elephant oil.

In 1825, the British sealer John Nunn and three crew members from Favourite were shipwrecked on Kerguelen until they were rescued in 1827 by Captain Alexander Distant during his hunting campaign.

The islands were not completely surveyed until the Ross expedition of 1840.

The Australian James Kerguelen Robinson (1859–1914) was the first human born south of the Antarctic Convergence, on board the sealing ship Offley in Gulf of Morbihan (Royal Sound then), Kerguelen Island on 11 March 1859.

In 1874–1875, British, German, and U.S. expeditions visited Kerguelen to observe the transit of Venus. For the 1874 transit, George Biddell Airy of the U.K. Royal Observatory organised and equipped five expeditions to different parts of the world. Three of these were sent to the Kerguelen Islands and led by Stephen Joseph Perry, who set up his main observation station at Observatory Bay and two auxiliary stations, one at Thumb Peak led by Sommerville Goodridge, and the second at Supply Bay, led by Cyril Corbet. Observatory Bay was also used by the German Antarctic Expedition, led by Erich Dagobert von Drygalski in 1902–1903. In January 2007, an archaeological excavation was carried out at this site.

In 1877 the French started a coal mining operation, but soon abandoned it.

In 1892, due to German operations in the area, France sent the aviso Eure, under Commander Lieutard, to reassert its claim over the Kerguelen Islands, the islands of Amsterdam and St. Paul, and the Crozet Archipelago. In 1924, it was decided to administer these territories (in addition to that portion of Antarctica claimed by France and known as Adélie Land) from Madagascar; as with all Antarctic territorial claims, France's possession on the continent is held in abeyance until a new international treaty is ratified that defines each claimant's rights and obligations.

In 1908, the French explorer Raymond Rallier du Baty made a privately funded expedition to the island. His autobiographical account of the adventure (1917 - 15,000 Miles in a Ketch. Thomas Nelson and Sons: London) describes the months that he spent surveying the island and hunting seals to finance his expedition.

The German auxiliary cruiser  called at Kerguelen during December 1940. During their stay the crew performed maintenance and replenished their water supplies. This ship's first fatality of the war occurred when a sailor, Bernhard Herrmann, fell while painting the funnel. He is buried in what is sometimes referred to as "the southernmost German war grave" of World War II.

Kerguelen has been continually occupied since 1950 by scientific research teams, with a population of 50 to 100 personnel frequently present. There is also a French satellite tracking station.

Until 1955, the Kerguelen Islands were administratively part of the French Colony of Madagascar and Dependencies. In 2004 they were permanently transformed into their own entity (keeping the same name) but having inherited another group of five very remote tropical islands, which are also ruled by France and are dispersed widely throughout the southern Indian Ocean.

Grande Terre

The main island of the archipelago is called .

Port-aux-Français, a scientific base, is along the eastern shore of the Gulf of Morbihan on La Grande Terre. Facilities there include scientific-research buildings, a satellite tracking station, dormitories, a hospital, a library, a gymnasium, a pub, and the chapel of Notre-Dame des Vents.

Grande Terre has also numerous bays, inlets, fjords, and coves, as well as several peninsulas and promontories. The most important ones are listed below:
 Courbet Peninsula
 Péninsule Rallier du Baty
 Péninsule Gallieni
 Péninsule Loranchet
 Péninsule Jeanne d'Arc
 Presqu'île Ronarc'h
 Presqu'île de la Société de Géographie
 Presqu'île Joffre
 Presqu'île du Prince de Galles
 Presqu'île du Gauss
 Presqu'île Bouquet de la Grye
 Presqu'île d'Entrecasteaux
 Presqu'île du Bougainville
 Presqu'île Hoche

Notable localities
There are also a number of notable localities, all on La Grande Terre (see also the main map):
 Anse Betsy (Betsy Cove) is a former geomagnetic station on Baie Accessible (Accessible Bay), on the north coast of the Courbet Peninsula. On this site an astronomical and geomagnetic observatory was erected on 26 October 1874 by a German research expedition led by Georg Gustav Freiherr von Schleinitz. The primary goal of this station was the 1874 observation of the transit of Venus.
 Baie de l'Observatoire (Observatory Bay) is a former geomagnetic observation station, just west of Port-Aux-Français, on the eastern fringe of the Central Plateau, along the northern shore of the Golfe du Morbihan.
 Cabane Port-Raymond is a scientific camp at the head of a fjord cutting into the Courbet Peninsula from the south.
 Cap Ratmanoff is the easternmost point of the Kerguelens.
 La Montjoie is a scientific camp on the south shore of Baie Rocheuse, along the northwestern coast of the archipelago.
An American expedition led by G. P. Ryan erected a station at this site on 7 September 1874. That station was also established to observe the 1874 transit of Venus.
 Port Bizet is a seismographic station on the northeastern coast of Île Longue. This also serves as the principal sheep farm for the island's resident flock of Bizet sheep.
 Port Christmas is a former geomagnetic station on Baie de l'Oiseau, in the extreme northwest of the Loranchet Peninsula. It was named by Captain James Cook, who re-discovered the islands and who anchored there on Christmas Day, 1776. This is also the place where Captain Cook coined the name "Desolation Islands" in reference to what he saw as a sterile landscape.
 Port Couvreux, a former whaling station, experimental sheep farm, and geomagnetic station is on Baie du Hillsborough, on the southeast coast of Presqu'île Bouquet de la Grye. Starting in 1912, sheep were raised here to create an economic base for future settlement. However, the attempt failed and the last inhabitants had to be evacuated, and the station abandoned, in 1931. The huts remain, as well as a graveyard with five anonymous graves. These are those of the settlers who were unable to survive in the harsh environment.
 Port Curieuse, a harbor on the west coast across Île de l'Ouest, was named after the ship La Curieuse, which was used by Raymond Rallier du Baty on his second visit to the islands (1913–14).
 Port Douzième (Twelfth Port) is a hut and former geomagnetic station on the southern shore of the Golfe du Morbihan.
 Port Jeanne d'Arc is a former whaling station founded by a Norwegian whaling company in 1908, and a former geomagnetic station, and lies in the northwestern corner of Presqu'île Jeanne d'Arc, looking across the Buenos Aires passage to Île Longue ( northeast). The derelict settlement consists of four residential buildings with wooden walls and tin roofs, and a barn. One of the buildings was restored in 1977, and another in 2007.

From 1968 to 1981, a site just east of Port-aux-Français was a launching site for sounding rockets, some for French (Dragon rockets), American (Arcas) or French-Soviet (Eridans) surveys, but at the end mainly for a Soviet program (M-100).

Islands
The following is a list of the most important adjacent islands:
 Île Saint-Lanne Gramont, is to the west of Île Foch in the Golfe Choiseul. Its highest point reaches .
 Île de l'Ouest (west coast, about )
 Île Longue (southeast, about )
 Îles Nuageuses (northwest, including île de Croÿ, île du Roland, îles Ternay, îles d'Après)
 Île de Castries
 Îles Leygues (north, including île de Castries, île Dauphine)
 Île Violette
 Île Australia (also known as Île aux Rennes – Reindeer Island) (western part of the Golfe du Morbihan, area , elevation )
 Île Haute (western part of the Golfe du Morbihan, elevation )
 Île Mayès
 Îles du Prince-de-Monaco (south, in the Audierne bay)
 Île Altazin (a small island in the Swains Bay)
 Île Gaby (a small island in the Swains Bay)

Economy

Principal activities on the Kerguelen Islands focus on scientific research, mostly earth sciences and biology.

The former sounding rocket range to the east of Port-aux-Français is currently the site of a SuperDARN radar.

CNES needed a tracking station in the Southern Hemisphere, and the French government required that it be located on French territory, rather than in a populated, but foreign, place like Australia or New Zealand.

Agricultural activities were limited until 2007 to raising sheep (about 3,500 Bizet sheep, a breed that is rare in mainland France) on Longue Island for consumption by the occupants of the base, as well as small quantities of vegetables in a greenhouse within the immediate vicinity of the main French base. There are also feral rabbits and sheep that can be hunted, as well as wild birds.

Geology

The Kerguelen Islands form an emerged part of the submerged Kerguelen Plateau, which has a total area nearing . The plateau was built by volcanic eruptions associated with the Kerguelen hotspot, and now lies on the Antarctic Plate.

The major part of the volcanic formations visible on the islands is characteristic of an effusive volcanism, which caused a trap rock formation to start emerging above the level of the ocean 35 million years ago. This form of volcanism creates a monumental relief shaped as stairs of pyramids.

Other forms of volcanism are present locally, such as the strombolian volcano Mont Ross, and the volcano-plutonic complex on the Rallier du Baty Peninsula. Various veins and extrusions of lava such as trachytes, trachyphonolites, and phonolites are common all over the islands.

No eruptive activity has been recorded in historic times, but some fumaroles are still active in the south-west of Grande-Terre island.

A few lignite strata, trapped in basalt flows, reveal fossilised araucarian fragments, dated at about 14 million years of age.

Glaciation caused the depression and tipping phenomena which created the gulfs at the north and east of the archipelago. Erosion caused by the glacial and fluvial activity carved out the valleys and fjords; erosion also created conglomerate detrital complexes, and the plain of the Courbet Peninsula.

The islands are part of a submerged microcontinent called the Kerguelen Subcontinent. The microcontinent emerged substantially above sea level for three periods between 100 million years ago and 20 million years ago. The so-called Kerguelen Subcontinent may have had tropical flora and fauna about 50 million years ago. Kerguelen's sedimentary rocks are similar to ones found in Australia and India, indicating they were all once connected. Scientists hope that studying the Kerguelen sub-continent will help them discover how Australia, India, and Antarctica broke apart.

Climate

Kerguelen's climate is oceanic, cold, and extremely windswept. Under the Köppen climate classification, Kerguelen's climate is considered to be an ET or tundra climate, which is technically a form of polar climate, as the average temperature in the warmest month is below . Comparable climates include the Aleutian Islands, Campbell Island (New Zealand), Falkland Islands, Iceland, northern Kamchatka Peninsula (Russia), Labrador (Canada), and Wollaston Islands (Chile).

All climate readings come from the Port-aux-Français base, which has one of the more favourable climates in Kerguelen because of its proximity to the coast and its location in a gulf sheltered from the wind.

Annual high temperatures rarely surpass , while temperatures in winter have never been recorded below  at sea level.

Kerguelen receives frequent precipitation, with snow throughout the year as well as rain. Port-aux-Français receives a modest amount of precipitation ( per annum) compared to the west coast which receives an estimated three times as much precipitation per year.

The mountains are frequently covered in snow but can thaw very quickly in rain. Over the course of several decades, many permanent glaciers have shown signs of retreat, with some smaller ones having disappeared completely.

The west coast receives almost continuous wind at an average speed of  because the islands are between the Roaring Forties and the Furious Fifties.

Flora and fauna

The islands are part of the Southern Indian Ocean Islands tundra ecoregion that includes several subantarctic islands. Plant life is mainly limited to grasses, mosses, and lichens, although the islands are also known for the indigenous, edible Kerguelen cabbage, a good source of vitamin C to mariners. The main indigenous animals are insects along with large populations of ocean-going seabirds, seals, and penguins.

The wildlife is particularly vulnerable to introduced species; one particular problem has been cats. The main island is the home of a well-established feral cat population, descended from ships' cats. They survive on sea birds and the feral rabbits that were introduced to the islands. There are also populations of wild sheep (Ovis orientalis orientalis) and reindeer.

In the 1950s and 1960s, French geologist Edgar Albert de la Rue began to introduce several species of salmonids. Of the seven species introduced, only brook trout  and brown trout  survived to establish wild populations.

Coleoptera
 Carabidae
 Oopterus soledadinus [introduced]
 Hydraenidae
 Meropathus chuni [endemic]

In popular culture 
The islands appear in a number of fictional works. The title character in Edgar Allan Poe's 1838 novel The Narrative of Arthur Gordon Pym of Nantucket visits the islands. French writer Jules Verne's 1897 novel An Antarctic Mystery offers a follow up to Poe's book, and revisits the Kerguelen Islands. 

The 1874 short story "The Tachypomp" by Edward Page Mitchell tells of a hole through the center of the Earth with one end in the United States and the other in "Kerguellen's Land" (which is roughly antipodal to the United States and Canada). 

Henry De Vere Stacpoole set his 1919 novel The Beach of Dreams on the islands.

French author Jean-Paul Kauffmann produced a non-fiction account of his 1991 journey to the islands, titled The Arch of Kerguelen: Voyage to the Islands of Desolation.

The islands inspired the 2008 song "The Loneliest Place on the Map" by singer Al Stewart.

See also

 Administrative divisions of France
 List of Antarctic and subantarctic islands
 List of French overseas islands
 Overseas France

References

External links 

  
  
 Including a toponymy index.
 Personal site with many pictures
 Rocket launches on the Kerguelen Islands
 

 
Archipelagoes of the Indian Ocean
Archipelagoes of the French Southern and Antarctic Lands
Tundra
Antarctic ecoregions
Seal hunting
Subantarctic islands
Volcanic islands
Volcanoes of the French Southern and Antarctic Lands
01
Lists of coordinates
French Southern and Antarctic Lands